Murricia is a genus of tree trunk spiders that was first described by Eugène Simon in 1882.

Species
 it contains six species:
Murricia cornuta Baehr & Baehr, 1993 – Singapore
Murricia crinifera Baehr & Baehr, 1993 – Sri Lanka
Murricia hyderabadensis Javed & Tampal, 2010 – India
Murricia trapezodica Sen, Saha & Raychaudhuri, 2010 – India
Murricia triangularis Baehr & Baehr, 1993 – India
Murricia uva Foord, 2008 – Cameroon to Uganda

References

Araneomorphae genera
Hersiliidae
Spiders of Africa
Spiders of Asia
Taxa named by Eugène Simon